The 6th Central Committee of the Lao People's Revolutionary Party (LPRP) was elected at the 5th LPRP National Congress in 1996.

Members

References

Specific

Bibliography
Articles:
 

Books
 

6th Central Committee of the Lao People's Revolutionary Party
1996 establishments in Laos
2001 disestablishments in Laos